Anneke Titi Hapsari Jodi (born 22 August 1985), better known as Anneke Jodi, is an Indonesian actress, best known for her television and film works. Anne, her nickname is daughter of Jodi Sulistyoadi Soesilo and Dyah Sukaning Tyas. beside Soap Opera, Anne had ever received several awards including the Revlon 2001 Youth Runner-up.

Career 
Anne's early career began when she was invited by her mother to John Casablanca Modelling. Started from there, Anne got an offer of an agency model in Jakarta. Her career is developing. After often become a model fashion in Majalah Remaja, Anne expanded the art world the role. Her first Soap Opera is Kisah Adinda, where she played as Adinda. Other Soap Operas are Primadona, Gatot Kaca, Gol, and Intan. She ever star advertisement Waisan, Pond’s, Fresh & Natural, dan BNI. In 2007, she also had starred in the soap opera Intan. In that soap opera, she roled as Rosa.

Personal life
Anneke marries Spencer Jeremiah on July 1, 2017 in Uluwatu, Bali.

Filmography

Film

Television

References

External links 
 
 
 

Living people
1985 births
People from Manado
Indonesian film actresses
Indonesian television actresses
Indonesian actresses